Jappe is a surname. Notable people with the surname include:

Paul Jappe (1898–1989), American football player
Anselm Jappe (born 1962), German professor